The 1929 North Carolina Tar Heels football team represented the University of North Carolina in the 1929 college football season. The team scored a total of 346 points.

Schedule

References

North Carolina
North Carolina Tar Heels football seasons
North Carolina Tar Heels football